is a Japanese cyclist, who currently rides for and manages Japanese amateur team .

Major results

2008
 9th Overall Tour de Indonesia
1st Stages 4 & 9
2009
 2nd  Madison, Asian Track Championships (with Kazuhiro Mori)
2012
 1st Stage 1 Tour de Singkarak
2013
 4th Road race, National Road Championships
 6th Overall Tour de East Java
 10th Overall Tour de Taiwan
2015
 9th Tour de Okinawa
 10th Overall Tour de Kumano
 10th Overall Tour de Hokkaido
2016
 5th Overall Tour of Thailand
 5th Overall Tour de Kumano
2020
 6th Malaysian International Classic Race
2021
 6th Overall Tour of Japan
 6th Oita Urban Classic
 8th Road race, National Road Championships

References

External links

1988 births
Living people
Japanese male cyclists
Sportspeople from Yokohama
21st-century Japanese people